Festuca eskia is a species of grass which is native to southwestern Europe, in France and Spain.

Description
Leaf sheaths are smooth and have a hairy surface while the leaf-blades are straight but curved and are  broad. The same is with leaf-blades, only they are also ribbed and have a pungent apex.

It hybrizes with F. gautieri giving rise to the natural hybrid, F. xpicoeuropeana.

References

eskia
Flora of France
Flora of Spain